The 4th convocation of the Sukhumi City Council held office from 10 March 2007 until March 2011.

Formation

2011 City Council election
The 26 seats of the Sukhumi Municipal assembly were contested by 66 candidates.

Rerun in constituencies no. 3, 19 and 26
Elections in constituencies no. 3, 19 and 26 were judged invalid, in the latter two cases because turnout had not surpassed 25%. Reruns were scheduled for 1 April, with the nomination period running from 20 February to 12 March and the registration period from 13 to 22 March.

By-election

Constituency no. 21

In April 2007, while President Sergei Bagapsh was in Moscow for medical treatment, the results of an investigation into corruption within the Sukhumi city administration were made public. The investigation found that large sums had been embezzled and upon his return, on 2 May, Bagapsh fired Adleiba along with his deputy Boris Achba, the head of the Sukhumi's finance department Konstantin Tuzhba and the head of the housing department David Jinjolia.

On 4 June Adleiba paid back to the municipal budget 200,000 rubels. On 20 July, Adleiba resigned from the Sukhumi City Council, citing health reasons and the need to travel abroad for medical treatment.

The subsequent by-election was held on 2 September, the nomination period lasting from 24 July to 12 August and the registration period from 13 to 23 August. Alias Labakhua was the only candidate in the by-election, he had already been appointed acting mayor on 15 May. Labakhua was elected with 265 votes in favour and 2 against. The election was declared valid with a turnout of 34% (267 out of 789 registered voters). On 18 September Labakhua was permanently appointed mayor by President Bagapsh.

Composition

Leadership

On 21 February, the new city assembly director of the Sukhumi shoe factory Adgur Amichba as its chairman with 15 out of 23 votes, over outgoing Chairman Givi Gabnia. Head of the state company Abkhazavtotrans Raul Bebia was elected deputy chairman, history teacher Nina Storozhenko was elected secretary.

List of members

References

Administration of the President of Abkhazia

Apsnypress

Caucasian Knot

Institute for War and Peace Reporting

Regnum

 
2007 establishments in Abkhazia
2011 disestablishments in Abkhazia